Cymbiola flavicans, common name the yellow volute, is a species of sea snail, a marine gastropod mollusk in the family Volutidae, the volutes.

Description
The size of the shell varies between 60 mm and 100 mm.

Distribution
This marine species occurs off Papua New Guinea and Australia (Northern Territory, Queensland).

References

 Gmelin J.F. 1791. Caroli a Linné. Systema Naturae per regna tria naturae, secundum classes, ordines, genera, species, cum characteribus, differentiis, synonymis, locis. Lipsiae : Georg. Emanuel. Beer Vermes. Vol. 1(Part 6) pp. 3021–3910.
 Lamarck, J.P.B.A de M. 1811. Suite de la détermination des espèces de mollusques testacés, Mitre (Mitra). Annales du Muséum d'Histoire Naturelle, Paris 17: 54–80, 195–222 
 Swainson, W. 1823. The characters of several rare and undescribed shells. Philosophical Magazine London 61: 375–378
 Wood, W. 1828. Index Testaceologicus; or A Catalogue of Shells, British and Foreign, arranged according to the Linnean system. London : Taylor Supplement, pp. 1–59, pls 1–8. 
 Broderip, W.J. 1847. Description of a new species of Volute. Proceedings of the Zoological Society of London 15: 232–233
 Crosse, J.C.H. 1867. Description d'espèces nouvelles. Journal de Conchyliologie 3 5: 195–197
 Iredale, T. 1956. A Northern Australian Volute. Proceedings of the Royal Zoological Society of New South Wales 1954–55: 76–77, fig. 71
 Iredale, T. 1957. Another Australian Volute. Proceedings of the Royal Zoological Society of New South Wales 1955–56: 91–92
 Weaver, C.S. & du Pont, J.E. 1970. Living Volutes – A Monograph of the Recent Volutidae of the World. Monograph Series No. 1. Greenville Delaware : Delaware Museum of Natural History pp. 1–375. 
 Poppe, G.T. & Goto, Y. 1992. Volutes. Ancona : L'Informatore Piceno 348 pp., pl. 1–107.
 Wilson, B. 1994. Australian Marine Shells. Prosobranch Gastropods. Kallaroo, WA : Odyssey Publishing Vol. 2 370 pp. 
 Bail P. & Poppe G.T. 2001. A conchological iconography: a taxonomic introduction of the recent Volutidae. ConchBooks, Hackenheim. 30 pp, 5 pl.

External links
 

Volutidae
Gastropods described in 1791